Alessandro Siano (born 28 April 2001) is an Italian footballer who plays as goalkeeper for  club Pontedera.

Career 
Siano started his career at Brandizzo, a children's football team in Turin. Siano played Juventus Youth Sector for ten years. On 26 August 2020, he joined Imolese signing a two-year contract. On 10 May 2021, he had an anterior cruciate ligament knee injury. He ended the 2020–21 season having played 36 matches, conceding 52 goals and having made nine clean sheets. On 31 January 2022, Siano rejoined Juventus, playing for their under-23s team. Siano debuted for Juventus U23 on 27 February, in a 1–1 draw against AlbinoLeffe. On 15 July, he was signed by Pontedera on a two-year contract.

Style of play 
Siano has a slim physique, he is very responsive and he is good at passing the ball.

Career statistics

References 

2001 births
People from Chivasso
Italian footballers
Association football goalkeepers
Serie C players
Juventus F.C. players
Juventus Next Gen players
Imolese Calcio 1919 players
U.S. Città di Pontedera players
Living people
Footballers from Piedmont
Sportspeople from the Metropolitan City of Turin